Cunerus Petri (ca. 1530–1580) was the first bishop of Leeuwarden to take possession of the see. He was nominated in succession to Remi Drieux, who had been unable to do so before being translated to the position of bishop of Bruges.

Life
Petri was born around 1530 in Duivendijke, near Brouwershaven in the County of Zeeland. He studied Philosophy and Theology at Leuven University, graduating with a doctorate in Theology on 12 November 1560.

He was named bishop of Leeuwarden in 1569, and was installed 1570. On 26 February 1570 he published the decrees of the Council of Trent in his diocese, and on 15 April held a diocesan synod. In December 1576 the States of the Lordship of Friesland subscribed to the Pacification of Ghent.  On 28 March 1578 Petri was imprisoned by the rebels in Harlingen. Upon his release he sought refuge in Germany, dying in Cologne on 15 February 1580.

Works
Een seker bewijs vanden vaghevier (Leuven, Rutger Velpius, 1566). Available on Google Books.
Tractaet vant hoochwaerdich sacrament des aultaers (Leuven, Rutger Velpius, 1567). Available on Google Books.
De Christiani Principis Officio (Cologne, Maternus Cholinus, 1579) Available on Google Books.

References

1530s births
1580 deaths
16th-century Roman Catholic bishops in the Holy Roman Empire
People from Schouwen-Duiveland
Academic staff of the Old University of Leuven
Academic staff of the University of Cologne